The 186th Massachusetts General Court, consisting of the Massachusetts Senate and the Massachusetts House of Representatives, met in 2009 and 2010 during the governorship of Deval Patrick. Therese Murray served as president of the Senate and Robert DeLeo served as speaker of the House.

Senators

Representatives

See also
 111th United States Congress
 List of Massachusetts General Courts

References

External links
 
 
 
 
  (includes some video)

Political history of Massachusetts
Massachusetts legislative sessions
massachusetts
2009 in Massachusetts
massachusetts
2010 in Massachusetts